Joseff of Hollywood was a jewelry firm, founded by Eugene Joseff.

The firm was particularly noted for creating costume jewelry for many of the biggest films and movie stars of the 1930s and 1940s, including Shirley Temple in The Little Princess, Vivien Leigh in Gone with the Wind, and Elizabeth Taylor in Cleopatra.

Eugene Joseff (September 25, 1905, Chicago - 1948) aka Joseff of Hollywood was born in the family of Austrian descent. His widow Joan Castle Joseff owned the company until her death in 2010.

Today the family business focuses on precision investment casting of parts for machinery and aircraft with the other company founded by Joseff - "Precision Investment Castings".

References

Jewelry companies of the United States
Companies based in Los Angeles